Prashanth Kalinga is an Indian professional footballer who last played as a defender for Bengaluru FC in the Indian Super League.

Youth career

Career

Bengaluru FC
Kalinga was promoted to the senior team during 2016 AFC Cup campaign. He made his debut in 2017 AFC Cup against Transport United on 23 January 2018. On 8 June 2018 Bengaluru fc released him along with 4 other players.

References

Living people
Indian footballers
Footballers from Karnataka
Bengaluru FC players
Indian Super League players
Association football defenders
Year of birth missing (living people)